USA-262, also known as GPS IIF-10, GPS SVN-72 and NAVSTAR 74, is an American navigation satellite which forms part of the Global Positioning System. It was the tenth of twelve Block IIF satellites to be launched.

Launch 
Built by Boeing and launched by United Launch Alliance, USA-262 was launched at 15:36 UTC on 15 July 2015, atop an Atlas V 401 carrier rocket, vehicle number AV-055. The launch took place from Space Launch Complex 41 at the Cape Canaveral Air Force Station, and placed USA-262 directly into semi-synchronous orbit.

Orbit 
It is used to broadcast the PRN 08 signal, and operates in slot 3 of plane C of the GPS constellation.
 It is currently in service following commissioning on August 12, 2015.

References 

Spacecraft launched in 2015
GPS satellites
USA satellites
Spacecraft launched by Atlas rockets